Xuefeng Subdistrict is a subdistrict of Dongkou County in Hunan, China. It was one of three subdistricts established in July 2015. The subdistrict of Xuefeng  has 16 villages and a community under its jurisdiction.

History
The subdistrict was formed from 23 villages of the former Dongkou Town in July 2015.

Subdivisions
The subdistrict of Xuefeng has a community and 16 villages under its jurisdiction.

 Communities
 Hezitang Community

 Villages
 Baitian Village
 Baomu Village
 Dasheng Village
 Datian Village
 Dexiang Village
 Hetang Village
 Hongwei Village
 Huanan Village
 Madu Village
 Minfeng Village
 Mugua Village
 Pingmei Village
 Shuanglian Village
 Tianjing Village
 Yuanfeng Village
 Zhaling Village

References

Dongkou
Subdistricts of Hunan